Under the Influence is the sixth studio album by American rock band Warrant released in 2001. The album is a covers album with two original new tracks, "Face" and "Sub Human". The album is the last to feature vocalist Jani Lane, as the band's next release - Born Again features Black 'n Blue vocalist Jaime St. James.

Background
The band toured in support of the album with Poison in the summer of 2001 on the Glam Slam Metal Tour which was cut 3 weeks short due to back injuries sustained by Poison bassist Bobby Dall.

The cover of AC/DC's "Down Payment Blues" features guitarist Billy Morris on lead vocals. Morris was the band's newest lead guitarist, replacing Keri Kelli, who was only in the band for 8 months after replacing Rick Steier in early 2000. The album also features Mike Fasano, who became the band's newest in a long line of drummers.

Track listing

Personnel
Jani Lane - Lead vocals
Erik Turner - Rhythm Guitar
Jerry Dixon - Bass Guitar
Billy Morris - Lead Guitar, lead vocals (on "Down Payment Blues")
Mike Fasano - Drums
Mike Morris - Keyboards

References

External links
 Warrant Official Site
 Classic Warrant Videos on Sony BMG MusicBox

Warrant (American band) albums
2001 albums